The 1956 United States presidential election in Louisiana took place on November 6, 1956, as part of the 1956 United States presidential election. State voters chose ten representatives, or electors, to the Electoral College, who voted for president and vice president.

Louisiana was won by incumbent President Dwight D. Eisenhower (R–Pennsylvania), running with Vice President Richard Nixon, with 53.28% of the popular vote, against Adlai Stevenson (D–Illinois), running with Senator Estes Kefauver, with 39.51% of the popular vote. This was the first time a Republican presidential candidate won Louisiana since Rutherford B. Hayes in 1876. Along with Kentucky and West Virginia, Louisiana was one of 3 states that Dwight Eisenhower lost in 1952, but managed to flip in 1956.

Results

Results by parish

See also
 United States presidential elections in Louisiana

Notes

References

Louisiana
1956
1956 Louisiana elections